Marcus Culey (born 15 November 1993 in Sydney) is a retired Australian cyclist, who previously rode for UCI Continental team .

Major results

2017
 1st  Overall Tour de Molvccas
1st Stage 1
 4th Overall Tour of Quanzhou Bay
 7th Time trial, Oceania Cycling Championships
2018
 2nd Overall Tour de Siak
 4th Overall Tour de Ijen
1st Stage 1
 4th Overall Tour of Quanzhou Bay
 6th Overall Tour de Kumano
2019
 1st  Overall Tour de Selangor
1st  Points classification
1st  Mountains classification
1st Stages 1, 2, 3 & 4
 1st Stage 1 Tour de Langkawi
 1st Stage 3 Tour of Indonesia
 4th Overall Tour of Taiyuan
 7th Overall Tour of Quanzhou Bay
2020
 National Road Championships
3rd Road Race
7th Time trial
 3rd Overall Tour de Taiwan
1st  Mountains classification

References

External links
 
 
 

1993 births
Living people
Australian male cyclists
Cyclists from Sydney
20th-century Australian people
21st-century Australian people